The 1991 OFC U-17 Championship was the 4th edition of the OFC's under-17 Championship. It was held in Napier, New Zealand. The tournament was played as a single group, with all teams playing each other twice.

The winning team qualified for the 1991 FIFA U-17 World Championship

Australia won their fourth title from four attempts, finishing the tournament undefeated.

Participation
The tournament was contested by three teams.

Group stage

Top scorers
4 goals

 Vas Kalogeracos

 Alex Kiratzoglou

 Gary Kingi

3 goals
 Lorenzo Campagna

References
ozfootball.net - Australia Under 17's Matches for 1991
RSSSF - Oceania Preliminary Competition for the U-17 World Cup 1991
ultimatenzsoccer.com - Junior All Whites

OFC U-17 Championship
1991 in youth association football